Robert Henry Brom (September 18, 1938 – May 9, 2022) was an American prelate of the Roman Catholic Church. He served as bishop of the Diocese of Duluth in Minnesota, from 1983 to 1989, and as bishop of the Diocese of San Diego in Southern California from 1990 to 2013.

Biography

Early life and priesthood 
Brom was born in Arcadia, Wisconsin, on September 18, 1938. Brom was ordained a priest of the Diocese of Winona on December 18, 1963.

Bishop of Duluth 
On March 25, 1983, Pope John Paul II appointed Brom as bishop of the Diocese of Duluth. He was consecrated on May 23, 1983 by Archbishop John Roach at the Cathedral of Our Lady of the Rosary in Duluth, Minnesota.

On April 22, 1989, Pope John Paul II appointed Brom as coadjutor bishop of the Diocese of San Diego to assist Bishop Leo Maher.

Bishop of San Diego 
On July 10, 1990, after Pope John Paul II accepted the resignation of Bishop Maher,  Brom automatically became the new bishop of the Diocese of San Diego.

On September 7, 2007, the Diocese of San Diego agreed to a $200 million settlement to victims of childhood sexual abuse by priests serving in the diocese since its founding in 1935. Brom apologized to the victims and said that the offenders' histories would be made public.

Brom was responsible for the creation of two Catholic high schools: 

 Mater Dei Catholic High School in Chula Vista, California, replacing Marian Catholic High School in Imperial Beach, California
 Cathedral Catholic High School in Carmel Valley, California, replacing University of San Diego High School in Linda Vista, California

Brom also created a pastoral center in San Diego after selling the former chancery building to the University of San Diego.

On January 4, 2012, the apostolic nuncio to the United States, Archbishop Carlo Vigano, announced that Pope Benedict XVI had appointed Auxiliary Bishop Cirilo Flores as coadjutor bishop to Brom in the diocese.

Retirement and legacy 
Pope Francis accepted Brom's resignation on the latter's 75th birthday, September 18, 2013. He was succeeded automatically by Bishop Flores.  Robert Brom died in San Diego on May 9, 2022 at age 83.

See also
 

 Catholic Church hierarchy
 Catholic Church in the United States
 Historical list of the Catholic bishops of the United States
 List of Catholic bishops of the United States
 Lists of patriarchs, archbishops, and bishops

References

External links
 Roman Catholic Diocese of San Diego Official Site

1938 births
2022 deaths
People from Arcadia, Wisconsin
People from Winona, Minnesota
Roman Catholic Diocese of Winona-Rochester
Roman Catholic bishops of Duluth
Roman Catholic bishops of San Diego
Bishops appointed by Pope John Paul II
20th-century Roman Catholic bishops in the United States
21st-century Roman Catholic bishops in the United States
Catholics from Wisconsin